Asher D and Daddy Freddy were an English/Jamaican duo who recorded on the Music of Life label in the late 1980s, releasing an album - Ragamuffin Hip-Hop - considered groundbreaking for its fusion of ragga and rap music.

The due then collaborated on major-label single "We Are the Champions" in 1989, later included on Daddy Freddy's 1991 album Stress. Both also recorded as individuals.

References

English hip hop groups
English musical duos
Black British musical groups
British reggae musical groups
Reggae duos
Ragga musicians
Profile Records artists
Hip hop duos